Amalia Soraya (also known as Lia or Lia AFI) is an Indonesian singer and actress.

Lia had an interest in singing, dance and other creative activities from childhood. She was trained by an uncle and occasionally invited to sing onstage with his band.

Filmography 
Fantasi
FTV Love Academy/Kampus Cinta
Sinetron Kampus Cinta
FTV Susahnya Jatuh Cinta
FTV Blind Date
Sinetron De Neny (78 episode)
FTV De Pinkersz
FTV Pinky Boy
Sinetron Cinta Itu Nggak Buta

Album 
Terbaik (2009)

External links 
Indosiar website
Mailing List penggemar Lia AFI (Lia Lovers, L2 atau eL-tWo)

1984 births
Living people
Sundanese people
21st-century Indonesian women singers